In Galois theory, the inverse Galois problem concerns whether or not every finite group appears as the Galois group of some Galois extension of the rational numbers . This problem, first posed in the early 19th century, is unsolved.

There are some permutation groups for which generic polynomials are known, which define all algebraic extensions of  having a particular group as Galois group. There also are groups known not to have generic polynomials, such as the cyclic group of order .

More generally, let  be a given finite group, and let  be a field. Then the question is this: is there a Galois extension field  such that the Galois group of the extension is isomorphic to ? One says that  is realizable over  if such a field  exists.

Partial results
There is a great deal of detailed information in particular cases. It is known that every finite group is realizable over any function field in one variable over the complex numbers , and more generally over function fields in one variable over any algebraically closed field of characteristic zero.

David Hilbert had shown that this question is related to a rationality question for :

This criterion can for example be used to show that all the symmetric groups are realizable.

Much detailed work has been carried out on the question, which is in no sense solved in general. Some of this is based on constructing  geometrically as a Galois covering of the projective line: in algebraic terms, starting with an extension of the field  of rational functions in an indeterminate . After that, one applies Hilbert's irreducibility theorem to specialise , in such a way as to preserve the Galois group.

All permutation groups of degree 16 or less are known to be realizable over  the group PSL(2,16):2 of degree 17 may not be.

All 13 non-abelian simple groups smaller than PSL(2,25) (order 7800) are known to be realizable over

A simple example: cyclic groups
To do this, choose a prime  such that ; this is possible by Dirichlet's theorem.

Since  divides , the Galois group has a cyclic subgroup  of order .

(This statement should not though be confused with the Kronecker–Weber theorem, which lies significantly deeper.)

Worked example: the cyclic group of order three
For , we may take . Then  is cyclic of order six. We are interested in the subgroup } of order two. Consider the element .

 , 
 , 
 .

Using the identity:

,

one finds that

 ,
 ,
 .

Therefore  is a root of the polynomial

,

Symmetric and alternating groups
Hilbert showed that all symmetric and alternating groups are represented as Galois groups of polynomials with rational coefficients.

The polynomial  has discriminant

We take the special case

.

Furthermore,  can be written

and  can be factored to:

whose second factor is irreducible (but not by Eisenstein's criterion). Only the reciprocal polynomial is irreducible by Eisenstein's criterion. We have now shown that the group  is doubly transitive.

We can then find that this Galois group has a transposition. Use the scaling  to get

and with

we arrive at:

which can be arranged to

.

Any finite doubly transitive permutation group containing a transposition is a full symmetric group.

The discriminant of  equals

and this is not in general a perfect square.

Alternating groups
Solutions for alternating groups must be handled differently for odd and even degrees.

Odd Degree
Let

Under this substitution the discriminant of  equals

which is a perfect square when  is odd.

Even Degree
Let:

Under this substitution the discriminant of  equals:

which is a perfect square when  is even.

Again, Hilbert's irreducibility theorem implies the existence of infinitely many specializations whose Galois groups are alternating groups.

Rigid groups
Then  is called rigid if it is nonempty,  acts transitively on it by conjugation, and each element of  generates .

 showed that if a finite group  has a rigid set then it can often be realized as a Galois group over a cyclotomic extension of the rationals.

This can be used to show that many finite simple groups, including the monster group, are Galois groups of extensions of the rationals. All such triads are conjugate.

The prototype for rigidity is the symmetric group , which is generated by an -cycle and a transposition whose product is an -cycle. The construction in the preceding section used these generators to establish a polynomial's Galois group.

A construction with an elliptic modular function
Let  be any integer. A lattice  in the complex plane with period ratio  has a sublattice  with period ratio . Let  denote the elliptic modular function of Felix Klein. Define the polynomial  as the product of the differences  over the conjugate sublattices.

Use of Hilbert's irreducibility theorem gives an infinite (and dense) set of rational numbers specializing  to polynomials with Galois group  over  The groups  include infinitely many non-solvable groups.

Notes

References 
 Alexander M. Macbeath, Extensions of the Rationals with Galois Group PGL(2,Zn), Bull. London Math. Soc., 1 (1969),332-338.

 Helmut Völklein, Groups as Galois Groups, an Introduction, Cambridge University Press, 1996. ISBN 978-0521065030 . 
 
 Gunter Malle, Heinrich Matzat, Inverse Galois Theory, Springer-Verlag, 1999, .
 Gunter Malle, Heinrich Matzat, Inverse Galois Theory, 2nd edition, Springer-Verlag, 2018.
 Alexander Schmidt, Kay Wingberg, Safarevic's Theorem on Solvable Groups as Galois Groups (see also )
 Christian U. Jensen, Arne Ledet, and Noriko Yui, Generic Polynomials, Constructive Aspects of the Inverse Galois Problem, Cambridge University Press, 2002.

Galois theory
Unsolved problems in mathematics